Agnieszka Grochowska (born 31 December 1979) is a Polish film and theatre actress.

Life

She was born on 31 December 1979 in Warsaw. She graduated from the National Academy of Dramatic Art in Warsaw in 2002. In 2003, she started working at the Studio Theatre in Warsaw.

She is the recipient of the 2007 Shooting Stars Award. For her role in Shameless (2012), she received the Polish Academy Award for Best Actress, while her performances in The Welts (2004), In Darkness (2011) and Walesa. Man of Hope (2013) earned her three additional nominations. Grochowska was also recognised as the Best Actress for her role in the Norwegian comedy film Upperdog (2009) at the Amanda Awards, and received Polish Film Festival Awards for Trzy minuty. 21:37 (2011) and Obce niebo (2015). She was nominated for the Kanon Award, awarded at the Kosmorama International Film Festival in Trondheim. Her other notable roles include Julia in Just Love Me (2006) and Joanna in Expecting Love (2008). She had a supporting role in the 2018 musical drama Teen Spirit where she played the mother of Elle Fanning's character, Marla.

Grochowska was honoured with the Gold Cross of Merit and the Bronze Medal for Merit to Culture – Gloria Artis by the Polish government for her contributions to Polish culture.

Since July 2004, she has been married to director Dariusz Gajewski. In 2012 their first son was born — Władysław, and in 2016 the second — Henryk.

Selected filmography

References

External links
 

1979 births
Living people
Actresses from Warsaw
Polish film actresses
Polish stage actresses
21st-century Polish actresses
Recipients of the Bronze Medal for Merit to Culture – Gloria Artis
Aleksander Zelwerowicz National Academy of Dramatic Art in Warsaw alumni